Abū 'Abd Allāh Muḥammad ibn 'Imrān ibn Mūsā ibn Sa'īd ibn 'Abd Allāh al-Marzubānī  (c. 909 – 10 November 994), was a prolific author of adab, akhbar (news), history and ḥadīth (traditions). He lived all his life in his native city, Baghdad, although his family came originally from Khurāsān.

Life
Al-Marzubānī came from a wealthy family connected to the royal court of the Abbāsid caliph. Ibn al-Jawālīqī in his Kitāb al-Mu'arrab, explains that al-Marzubānī inherited his Persian epithet "Marzban", which means 'Guardian of the frontier'. The Buyid amir ‘Aḍūd al-Dawla was known to visit his residence on the east bank of the Tigris, where he would also entertain members of a literary circle dedicated to the conservation and transmission of Arabic philological literature. Fellow authors in his circle were Abū Ya'qūb al-Najīramī (d.1031), Abū Sa'īd al-Sīrāfī (d. 979) and Abū Bakr Muḥammad ibn 'Abd al-Malik al-Tārīkhī.  He edited the first dīwān (collected poems) by the Umayyad caliph Muawiyah I (r. 661–680), which he produced in a small volume of about three kurrāsa, – ca., 60 ff.

Al-Marzubānī's principal teachers
'Abd Allāh ibn Muḥammad al-Baghawī (829 – 929), jurist.
Abū Bakr ibn Abī Dā'ūd al-Sijistānī (ca. 844—928/929), ḥāfiẓ, scholar of Ḥadīth and Qur'an, and author of Kitāb al-Masābīh.
al-Ṣūlī held al-Marzubānī in high esteem and much of al-Marzubānī's material in his Kitāb al-Muwashshaḥ and his compilation technique was apparently borrowed from him.

Al-Marzubānī's principal authorities
Abū Bakr ibn Durayd (837 -934), a great grammarian of Basra.
Abū Bakr Muḥammad ibn al-Qāsim ibn al-Anbārī (855 – 940) was a famous pupil of Tha'lab.

Abū Bakr al-Khwārizmī led the funeral service.  He was buried in his house on Shari Amr al-Rūmī (Amr the Greek Street), on the eastern quarter of Baghdād.

Legacy
He was the last of the authorities of literary and oral tradition Isḥāq al-Nadīm met.  He was cited by the Mu'tazilite theologian Abū 'Abd Allāh al-Ṣaymarī (d. 927/8), Abū al-Qāsim al-Tanūkhi (940 – 994), Abū Muḥammad al-Jauhari, et al.  Some sectarian-based criticismattributed to al-Marzubānī's religious leanings and madhhab, despite his publication of Ḥanafī, Shī'i and Mu'tazila riwāya and akhbar (biographies).seems to have led to the relative neglect of his writings by Sunni scholars in later centuries.

Works
Among his books were:
{{columns-list|colwidth=50em|
Al–Mu'niq  'Pleasing'; accounts of famous pre–Islamic poets, from Imru' al-Qays and members of his category, with a thorough investigation of their traditions; to poets from the pre-to-early-Islāmic period, and the Muslims following them and their generations; early Muslims and their best traditions about Jarīr ibn 'Aṭīyah, al-Farazdaq and their cohort before the 'Abbāsid era; Ibn Harmah (685 – 767) and al-Ḥusayn ibn Muṭayr al-Asadī (d. 767), and poets; over 5000 ff.
Al–Mustanīr 'Illuminating'; anthology of famous modern poets and selected poetry according to age and period; From Bashshār ibn Burd, to Abū al-'Abbās 'Abd Allāh ibn al-Mu'tazz bi-Allāh. —6000 ff; in an autograph by al-Marzubānī in sixty Sulaymānīyah volumes.
Al-Mufīd 'Profitable'; §1—late-pre-early-Islāmic poets with paternal or maternal surnames, genealogies, patrons, affiliations etc.; §2—references to physical characteristics of poets; §3—religious ideologies and practices of poets;  §4—those who spurned pre-Islāmic poetry in favour of Islām and religious piety; or satire for eulogy; or love poetry for virtuosity; and those dedicated to a single poetic subject, such as Sayyid ibn Muḥammad al-Ḥimyarī and al-'Abbās ibn al-Aḥnaf, et al. 5000 ff.
Al-Mu'jam 'The Alphabetical Book'; a dictionary of ca., 5000 poets and selected verses, and best known stanzas; over 1000 ff.
Al-Muwashshaḥ 'The Acrostic', literary criticism of poetry by the authorities (al-'ulamā'), such as use, and inconsistent use, of vowel signs, mispronunciations, final syllable repetition in a verse, irregular rhyming, changes, ambiguity, loose weaving of the composition, and other errors in poetry; over 300 ff.
Al-Shi'r 'Poetry' a compendium of descriptions of qualities, benefits, defects; kinds, forms, measures, prosody, essential characteristics, selections; compositional and recitational poetic training, plagiarismdetection, varieties and forms. Over 2000 ff.
Ash'ār al-Nisā 'Poems of Women'; ca. 500 ff.
Kitab Ash'ār al-Khulafā 'Poems of the Caliphs'; over 200 ff.
Al-Muqtabas 'Things Quoted', traditions of the grammarians of al-Baṣrah, the first grammarian and author of a book on grammar; traditions about al-Farrā' and the scholars of al-Baṣrah and of al-Kūfah, the  quoters (transmitters), and residents of the 'City of Peace' (Baghdād); ca., 3000 ff.
Al-Murshid 'Guide to the Right Way'; traditions of al-mutakallimūn and the People of Justice and Oneness ('Mu'tazilah'), their assemblies and doctrines; ca 1000 ff.
Ash'ār al-Jinn 'Poems Attributed to the Jinn'; ca. 100 ff.
Al-Riyāḍ 'Gardens'; accounts of obsessed people arranged by category; passionate love and its effects, its start and end; terminology and varieties recorded by the philologists; derivations of the terms, with examples from poems by pre-Islāmic poets and by converts to Islām, Muslim and contemporary poets; over 3000 ff.
Al-Wāthiq 'The Clear'; characteristics, qualities, forms, and methods of song; traditions on freeborn, handmaid, and male and female slave singers; over 1600 ff.
Al-Azminah 'The Seasons'; characteristics of the four seasons;  heat and cold; clouds and lightning, wind and rain, al-rawwād ('fresh pasturage'), prayers for rain, spring and autumn; ẓurafā ("beauties") of the celestial sphere, the houses of the zodiac, the sun, and the moon with its stations; astrological descriptions and poems of Arabs; planets and the fixed stars, day and night, Arab and Persian days, months and years; periods and eras, language connections to sections of this book, historical traditions, poems, explanations; ca., 2000 ff.
Al-Anwār wa-al-Thimār 'Flowers and Fruits'. References in poetry, records and traditions, to the rose, the narcissus, and other flowers; praise in poetry and prose of certain fruits, palms etc; ca., 500 ff.
Akhbār al-Barāmakah 'Traditions of the Barmak Family', their rise and downfall in disgrace; ca 500 ff.
Al-Mufaṣṣal 'Elocution and Eloquence,' Arabic elocution and calligraphy; ca 700 ff.
Al-Tahānī 'Congratulations'; ca., 500 ff.
Al-Taslīm wa-al-Ziyārah 'Submission and Pilgrimage'; 400 ff.
Al-'Ibādah 'Worship'; 400 ff.
Al-Maghāzī 'Raids'; ca., 300 ff.
Al-Marāthī 'Elegies'; 500 ff.
Al-Mu'allā 'The Exalted Book', excellencies of the Qur'ān; 200 ff.
Talqīḥ al-'Uqūl 'Fertilization of Minds', over 100 sections, on the mind, culture, learning, etc.; over 3000 ff.
Al-Mushrif 'The Noble Book', the rule of the Islamic prophet Muḥammad, his culture, his preaching, his companions, the testaments and the rule of the Arabs and Persians; 1500 ff.
Akhbār man Tamaththal bi-al-Ash'ār  'Traditions of Poets Who Use Metaphor'; over 100 ff.
Al-Shabāb wa-al-Shayb 'Youth and Old Age'; 300 ff.
Al-Mutawwaj 'Crowned', on justice and ethical living; over 100 ff.
Al-Madīḥ 'Praise, on banquets, invitations, and drink';
Al-Farkh 'The Young';{{refn|group=n|Kitāb al-Faraj, 'al-Furaj, or al-Farj'Relief';}} nearly 100 ff.Al-Hadāyā 'Gifts'; ca., 300 ff.Al-Muzakhraf 'Ornamented'; on the ikhwān 'Brothers' and aṣḥāb 'Companions'; 300 ff.Akhbār Abī Muslim al-Khurāsānī, Ṣāḥib al-Da'wah 'Traditions of Abū Muslim al-Khurāsānī, Giver of the Summons'; 100 ff.Al-Du'ā 'Supplication' (Invocation); ca., 200 ff.Al-Awā'il 'The Ancients'; eras and beliefs of ancient Persians and the People of Justice and Oneness, viz., the Mu'tazilah; ca., 1000 ff.Al-Mustaṭraf 'The Newly Acquired'; the foolish and unusual; over 300 ff.Akhbār al-Awlād wa-al-Zawjāt wa-al-Ahl 'Traditions of Children, Wives, and the Family', with praise and blame; 200 ff.Al-Zuhd wa-Akhbār al-Zuhhād 'Renunciation and Traditions of the Ascetics'; over 200 ff.Dhamm al-Dunyā 'Blame of the World'; over 100 ff.Al-Munīr 'The Shining'; repentance, good deeds, piety, abstinence from crime etc.; over 300 ff.Al-Mawā'iẓ wa-Dhikr al-Mawt 'Warnings and Mention of Death'; over 500 ff.Akhbār al-Muḥtaḍarīn 'Traditions about Those Near Death'; 100 ff.Dhamr al-Ḥujjāb 'Chiding the Chamberlain'; 100 ff.Shi'r Ḥātim al-Ṭa'ī' 'Poetry of Ḥātim al-Ṭa'ī'; ca., 100 ff.Akhbār Abū Ḥanīfah al-Nu'mān ibn Thābit 'Traditions of Abū Ḥanīfah al-Nu'mān ibn Thābit'; ca., 500 ff.Akhbār 'Abd al-Ṣamad ibn al-Mu'adhdhal 'Traditions of 'Abd al-Ṣamad ibn al-Mu'adhdhal'; ca., 200 ff.Akhbār Abī 'Abd Allāh 'Traditions of Abū 'Abd Allāh Muḥammad ibn Ḥamzah al-'Alawī; ca., 100 ff.Akhbār Mulūk Kindah 'Traditions of the Kings of Kindah'; ca., 200 ff.Akhbār Abī Tammām Traditions of Abū Tammām; ca., 100 ff.Akhbār Shu'bah ibn al-Ḥajjāj 'Traditions of Shu'bah ibn al-Ḥajjāj'; ca., 100 ff.Naskh al-'Uhūd 'Cancellation of Contracts'; addressed to the judges; ca., 200 ff.}}

Books about the SawādAn'ān al-Shi'r'Essences of Poetry'; about praise and satire, glory and generosityAkhbār al-Ajwād'Traditions about the Generous'Al-Awṣāf'Qualities'Al-Tashbihāt'''Allegories'

Isḥāq al-Nadīm records that 20,000 ff from sources written in al-Marzubānī's handwriting had survived to his day.

See also
List of Arab scientists and scholars

Notes

References

Bibliography
 
 
 
 
 
 
 
 
 
 
 
 

 
 
 
 

 
 
 
 
 
 
 
 
 
 
 

900s births
994 deaths
Year of birth uncertain
10th-century biographers
10th-century historians from the Abbasid Caliphate
Encyclopedists of the medieval Islamic world
Islamic culture
Islamic poetry
Writers from Baghdad